Christopher James Solly (born 20 January 1991) is an English professional footballer who plays as a right back for Ebbsfleet United.

Career

Charlton Athletic
Solly was born in Rochester, Kent. On 3 May 2009, he made his debut for Charlton Athletic, coming on as a first-half substitute for the injured Darren Ward in a 4–2 victory over Norwich City. Solly made his full debut for the 1st team in the Football League Trophy against Barnet on 6 October 2009. He scored his first goal for the club after coming on as a substitute in the 3–1 win over Leyton Orient on 13 August 2010. Due to the uncertainty over the future of Carl Jenkinson, Solly established himself as first choice right back towards the end of the 2010–11 season.

Despite the arrival of Andy Hughes, he continued to keep his place in the side the following season. Following an impressive 2011–12 season, Solly was voted Charlton's Player of the Year by supporters and selected as Young Player of the Year by the club's management team. He became the first Charlton player to win both awards in the same season since defender Richard Rufus in 1995.

Solly continued his impressive form into the 2012–13 season as Charlton finished 9th in their first season back in the Championship. Solly capped a fine season by winning the Charlton Player of the year award for a second year running.

Despite reported summer interest from Premier League clubs, Solly secured his future to Charlton by signing a new four-year deal in September of the 2013–14 season.

On 1 June 2020, Charlton manager Lee Bowyer accused Solly of refusing to play for the club ahead of the resumption of the 2019–20 EFL Championship season, following the suspension of the season due to the COVID-19 pandemic in the United Kingdom.

On 2 July 2020, it was confirmed that Solly had left Charlton after his contract expired.

Ebbsfleet United
On 11 December 2020, Solly joined National League South side Ebbsfleet United. Solly made his debut for Ebbsfleet United on 13 January 2021 in a 2-1 victory over Concord Rangers.

On 18 March 2021, it was confirmed that Solly would remain at Ebbsfleet United for the 2021-22 National League South season. As part of his new deal, Solly would also take on a first-team coaching role.

Solly was awarded the National League South Player of the Month award for September 2022 after captaining the side to top of the league.

Career statistics

Honours
Charlton Athletic
Football League One: 2011–12
EFL League One play-offs: 2019

Individual
Charlton Athletic Player of the Year: 2011–12, 2012–13
Charlton Athletic Young Player of the Year: 2011–12
National League South Player of the Month: September 2022

References

External links

Profile at the Charlton Athletic F.C. website

1991 births
Living people
People from Rochester, Kent
Footballers from Kent
English footballers
England youth international footballers
Association football defenders
Charlton Athletic F.C. players
Ebbsfleet United F.C. players
English Football League players
National League (English football) players
Association football coaches